Alalaú River is a river forming part of the border between the Amazonas and Roraima states in north-western Brazil, a tributary of the Jauaperi River.

The river basin is in the  Waimiri Atroari Indigenous Territory.
Tailings of processed tin ore from the Pitinga mine are held in holding ponds as a reserve that may be further processed if justified by a rise in the price of tin.
In 1987 the dykes of four ponds broke.
The sediment was released into the Alalaú River, and the pollution affected the fish downstream in the Waimiri-Atroari Indian Reserve.
The Indians reported that the polluted water had made them ill.

See also
List of rivers of Amazonas
List of rivers of Roraima

References

Sources

Rivers of Amazonas (Brazilian state)
Rivers of Roraima